Nadia Abdala (born August 14, 1988) is a Mexican former professional tennis player and member of the Mexico Fed Cup team.

On July 9, 2012, she reached her highest WTA singles ranking of 517 whilst her best doubles ranking was 525 on July 23, 2012.

ITF Circuit finals

Singles: 1 (runner-up)

Doubles: 4 (1 title, 3 runner-ups)

References

External links
 
 
 

1988 births
Living people
Mexican female tennis players
Mexican people of Lebanese descent
Mexican expatriates in the United States
Sportspeople of Lebanese descent
21st-century Mexican women